The 1960 European Nations' Cup qualifying preliminary round was the first round of the qualifying competition for the 1960 European Nations' Cup. The tie was played over two legs, home and away, in April and May 1959 and was contested by the Republic of Ireland and Czechoslovakia, as they were randomly selected to play each other. The winner on aggregate would advance to the round of 16.

The first leg was played on 5 April 1959, and won by the Republic of Ireland 2–0. Czechoslovakia won the return leg 4–0 on 10 May 1959, and therefore Czechoslovakia won 4–2 on aggregate. As winners, Czechoslovakia entered the round of 16 with the fifteen nations that had received a bye.

Because some of the matches of the round of 16 had already taken place when the matches of the preliminary round did, Republic of Ireland vs Czechoslovakia was not actually the first ever European Championship match (Soviet Union vs Hungary was), nor was the Republic of Ireland the first team to ever be eliminated from a European Championship (Greece was).

Summary

|}

Matches

First leg details

Second leg details

Goalscorers

References

External links
1960 European Nations' Cup qualifying preliminary round

Preliminary round
1960 European Nations' Cup qualifying
1960 European Nations' Cup qualifying
Republic of Ireland v Czechoslovakia (1960 European Nations' Cup qualifying)
UEFA Euro 1960 qualifying
UEFA Euro 1960 qualifying
European Nations' Cup qualifying preliminary round
European Nations' Cup qualifying preliminary round
European Nations' Cup qualifying preliminary round
European Nations' Cup qualifying preliminary round
Czechoslovakia at the 1960 European Nations' Cup
Football
Sports competitions in Bratislava